William Luxton (born 6 May 2003) is an English cricketer. He made his List A debut on 28 July 2021, for Yorkshire in the 2021 Royal London One-Day Cup. In December 2021, he was named in England's team for the 2022 ICC Under-19 Cricket World Cup in the West Indies. He made his first-class debut on 11 July 2022, for Yorkshire in the 2022 County Championship.

References

External links
 

2003 births
Living people
English cricketers
Yorkshire cricketers
Cricketers from Keighley